Colfax Township is a township in Marion County, Kansas, United States.  As of the 2010 census, the township population was 291, including the city of Ramona.

Geography

Communities
The township contains the following settlements:
 City of Ramona.

Cemeteries
The township contains the following cemeteries:
 Lewis Cemetery, located in Section 2 T17S R3E.
 Lutheran Church Cemetery, located in Section 19 T17S R3E.
 Mohn Cemetery (aka Tampa Mennonite Cemetery), located in Section 32 T17S R3E.
 St. Johns Lutheran Church Cemetery (aka North Tampa Cemetery), located in Section 6 T17S R3E.
 St. Mary's Catholic Church Cemetery, located in Section 19 T17S R3E.

References

Further reading

External links
 Marion County website
 City-Data.com
 Marion County maps: Current, Historic, KDOT

Townships in Marion County, Kansas
Townships in Kansas